"Money Machine" (stylized in lowercase) is the debut single by American hyperpop duo 100 Gecs, released on May 29, 2019 as the only single of their debut studio album, 1000 Gecs.

Production and release 
100 Gecs is a duo made up of Laura Les and Dylan Brady. "Money Machine" was produced some time after the release of their debut EP 100 Gecs, because they were interested in returning with the project. Brady started the project, creating the melody on Logic Pro. Les thought the instrumental was "sarcastic", as if the bass was "laughing at you". She recorded "a hilarious burst of trash talk" after fighting with men and after a day of working at her job. Les explained: "I had been watching a lot of King of the Hill, and I constructed in my head a sort of Hank Hill asshole character to just absolutely break down. I was just kind of getting into that sort of mindset of these people that I’d grown up with, these people in St. Louis talking about their big trucks." About the song title, Brady said that he gets inspiration for song titles from objects; "must have been some money on the ground". 

A remix by A. G. Cook was released on October 23, 2019, as the lead single off of their first remix album 1000 Gecs and the Tree of Clues.

Composition 
In "a whiny chipmunk voice" and "[taking] the idea of asserting dominance lyrically to the absurd", the song opens with the lyrics "Hey lil piss baby / You think you're so fucking cool, huh? / You think you're so fucking tough / You talk a lotta big game for someone with such a small truck", "[scanning] as pure chest-puffing braggadocio [and containing] one of the most appealingly strange taunts in recent memory", and then goes into a chorus "of scraping power chords that are kind of like a cross between Skrillex and Sophie. It's bizarre, a bit silly, but for the exact same reason, endlessly fascinating." The song also "compares arms to cigarettes, laments inadequate truck size and uses the term 'piss baby' as an insult". DIY described it as a "glitchy electronic-pop banger", and Pitchfork described it as "pulsing [and] cavity-inducing". We Rave You described it as a "bass-heavy [...] headspinner".

Music video 
On June 13, 2019, an official music video for the song was released. The music video has Brady and Les as "badass rapper-types mugging for the camera" as they step into a parking lot with some "rather large trucks", and distorted by layers of visual effects. According to Paper, "[t]he overall effect exists somewhere between a cybernetic hallucination and a deep fried meme. It's hard to pinpoint what is exactly so damn appealing about the video, but perhaps it's for that exact same reason that it's so damn entertaining."

Reception and legacy 
Pitchfork named it the 61st best song of 2019. Sasha Geffen, for the same website, wrote that the song "is a purification ritual for the rotted-out brain, a seething, monstrous prayer to burn the slime away". According to The New York Times, the music video for "Money Machine" helped 100 Gecs get a burst of attention. According to The Boar, they "exploded onto the scene" with the "preposterous" song, which "paved the way for future hyperpop artists who would go on to replicate these distinct features". It was included on Vulture list of "9 Songs That Wouldn't Exist Without Sophie".

Charts

References 

 

2019 singles
2019 songs
100 Gecs songs
Hyperpop songs
Songs written by Dylan Brady